Piney is a census-designated place (CDP) in Adair County, Oklahoma, United States. The population was 115 at the 2010 census.  Piney was the "head town" of the first wave of relocated Cherokee people (the "Old Settlers") who relocated there from their ancestral homelands in the southeastern United States.

History
Piney was established in 1824 as the Cherokee head town, serving as the council seat (informal capital) of the Cherokee Nation–West from 1824 to 1828.  The town was part of what was then Arkansaw Territory. In 1828, the western borders of the future state of Arkansas were finally drawn (running just one mile east of the settlement), and the old Arkansaw Territory was split into two. The Cherokee Nation capital city was created in the more centrally located Tahlonteeskee in Sequoyah County, located in the western side of the split (the new Indian Territory). Most of the Cherokee residents migrated further west into their designated districts in the Indian Territory following the territorial split.   A Baptist missionary, Duncan O'Bryant, who had served in Piney for a time, remained behind. He died in 1834 and his grave is located there.

Piney had a post office from November 24, 1913 to August 20, 1921.  The town reached its largest size circa 1916. It had a general store (where the post office was located); a gristmill; a blacksmith's shop; and a school, which is now used as a community building. The incorporated town continued until 1940. The original settlement of Piney is now considered a ghost town, although some residents still live in the area (2011).

Geography
No major roads run through the community.

Demographics

See also
 List of ghost towns in Oklahoma

References

Census-designated places in Adair County, Oklahoma
Census-designated places in Oklahoma
Ghost towns in Oklahoma
Geography of Adair County, Oklahoma
Cherokee towns in Oklahoma